Wesley Glenn Russell Jr. (born 1970) is a justice of the Supreme Court of Virginia and former judge of the Court of Appeals of Virginia.

Life and education 

Russell was born in 1970 in Hampton, Virginia and received his Bachelor of Arts from the University of Virginia and his Juris Doctor from Antonin Scalia Law School (previously George Mason University School of Law).

Legal career 

Prior to joining the court, Russell was the deputy attorney general for civil litigation for the Commonwealth of Virginia. He was also a partner at the law firm of McSweeney, Crump, Childress & Timple PC. He started his career as a law clerk for the Virginia 13th Judicial Circuit.

Judicial career

Service on Virginia Court of Appeals 

Russell was first elected by the General Assembly on March 10, 2006, to an eight-year term beginning January 20, 2014. His eight-year term began February 1, 2015. His term would have expired on January 31, 2023, however, he was elected to the Virginia Supreme Court.

Appointment to Supreme Court of Virginia 

On June 17, 2022, Russell was elected by the Virginia General Assembly 12-year term on the Supreme Court of Virginia beginning July 1, 2022.

References

External links

1970 births
Living people
20th-century American lawyers
21st-century American judges
Antonin Scalia Law School alumni
College of William & Mary alumni
Judges of the Court of Appeals of Virginia
Justices of the Supreme Court of Virginia
People from Hampton, Virginia
Virginia lawyers